is a Japanese footballer currently playing as a midfielder for Iwate Grulla Morioka.

Career statistics

Club
.

Notes

References

1998 births
Living people
Association football people from Nara Prefecture
Osaka Kyoiku University alumni
Japanese footballers
Association football midfielders
J3 League players
J2 League players
Iwate Grulla Morioka players